Taeniotes dentatus is a species of beetle in the family Cerambycidae. It was described by Dillon and Dillon in 1941. It is known from Ecuador and Colombia.

References

dentatus
Beetles described in 1941